Trevarno railway station is a small railway station request stop on the Helston Railway, a heritage railway in Cornwall, United Kingdom.

History
The Helston Railway Preservation Society started work at Trevarno in 2005 with volunteers starting work on re-opening a section of the line. William Bickford-Smith was the first chairman of the original Helston Railway and he lived at Trevarno House.

A tin mine once stood near by  however this was not the site of a station or halt until the Helston Railway opened a station here in 2011 as the terminus of the line at that time. It also served the Trevarno estate gardens until circa 2011. The grand opening ceremony of Trevarno Station was officially held on 26 July 2010 however the station was not able to operate as it was not permitted to carry passengers on that date.

Description
Trevarno Station has a through and a bay platform with a single long siding. It has a station lamp but it no longer has a station building or car park.

Services
This is a now request stop and passenger access is by the Black Bridge reached via a public footpath. Trevarno now lies about one third of the way along the existing line and up until 2012 it was the main operational base with passengers starting and ending their journeys here.

References

External links

2018 Helston Railway official site
Video 2018 Kilmersdon at Helston Railway
Video of Helston Railway - train goes through Trevarno station Cornwall England UK
Video of Winter Wonderland train Helston Railway Trevarno Cornwall
Video of Helston Railway December 2011 (brake van ride)
Video of driver's view of the Helston Railway

Heritage railway stations in Cornwall
Railway stations in Great Britain opened in 2011
Railway stations built for UK heritage railways